Count Aeneas Sylvius de Caprara (1631 – February 1701), also known as Enea Silvio or Äneas Sylvius von Caprara, was an Austrian Field Marshal during the Nine Years' War.

Biography
Born at Bologna to count Niccolò Caprara, he was  a descendant of generals Raimondo Montecuccoli and Ottavio Piccolomini. He  served under Charles V, Duke of Lorraine during the Dutch War at the Battles of Sinsheim, Enzheim, and Mulhouse where he was subsequently captured. Later released, Caprara would relieve the siege at Offenburg in 1677, before the war's end the following year. 

In 1683, during the Great Turkish War, Caprara would again return to the service of Charles of Lorraine against the Turkish advance into Hungary soon winning distinction after the siege and capture of Neuhaeusel from 7 July to 17 August 1685.  

At the start of the Nine Years' War, Caprara was appointed commander-in-chief of Imperial forces in northern Italy where, in 1692, he was involved in the campaign to capture the Dauphiné. Transferred to Hungary two years later, Caprara would remain commander-in-chief of Imperial forces in the region until his retirement in 1696, serving as vice president of the Imperial War Council until his death in February 1701.

References

Corrado Argegni: Condottieri, capitani e tribuni: Fino al cinquecento. Dizionari biografici e bibliografici, Vol. 1–3. Rome 1937. (Reprinted Milan, undated).

1631 births
1701 deaths
Military personnel from Bologna
Generals of former Italian states
Field marshals of the Holy Roman Empire
Military personnel of the Franco-Dutch War